Sociedade Esportiva de Buzios, known in English as The Sports Society of Buzios, or known simply as Buzios, is a male professional Brazilian football club based in Búzios, Rio de Janeiro. The club was founded on May 15, 1971.

History 
After conquering the four-time Buziana league of Sports in the Junior category in 2008, Buzios embarked in 2011 on its debut in professional football by joining the FFERJ Squad for the Rio de Janeiro State Championship Series.

See also 

 List of Brazilian football clubs
 Copa do Brasil
Brazilian Football league system

References 

Football clubs in Brazil
1971 establishments in Brazil
Association football clubs established in 1971